Hermann Kouao (born 31 December 1989) is an Ivorian footballer who plays as a forward.

References

External links
 

1989 births
Living people
Ivorian footballers
Ivorian expatriate footballers
SOA (football club) players
Séwé Sport de San-Pédro players
Smouha SC players
Al Urooba Club players
Al Ittihad Alexandria Club players
Al Masry SC players
Çetinkaya Türk S.K. players
Al-Nojoom FC players
Al Tadhamon SC players
Al-Diriyah Club players
Association football forwards
Ligue 1 (Ivory Coast) players
Egyptian Premier League players
UAE First Division League players
Oman Professional League players
Saudi First Division League players
Kuwait Premier League players
Expatriate footballers in Egypt
Ivorian expatriate sportspeople in Egypt
Expatriate footballers in the United Arab Emirates
Ivorian expatriate sportspeople in the United Arab Emirates
Expatriate footballers in Northern Cyprus
Ivorian expatriate sportspeople in Northern Cyprus
Expatriate footballers in Oman
Ivorian expatriate sportspeople in Oman
Expatriate footballers in Saudi Arabia
Ivorian expatriate sportspeople in Saudi Arabia
Expatriate footballers in Kuwait
Ivorian expatriate sportspeople in Kuwait